The Hammonton Gazette is a weekly local newspaper located in Hammonton, New Jersey. It was founded in 1997 by the then-23-year-old Gabriel J. Donio. The first print edition was published on July 2, 1997. Gabriel J. Donio is the publisher of The Gazette.  Gina L. Rullo is the editor-in-chief. The Gazette staff consists of approximately 30 people. Each Wednesday, the newspaper is distributed throughout Hammonton and the surrounding area. The newspaper primarily covers the town of Hammonton, focusing on local politics, businesses and residents.

The Hammonton Gazette’s “Neighbors” section includes information about the communities surrounding Hammonton including: Waterford Twp. (Atco); Folsom; Mullica Twp.; Vineland; Egg Harbor City; Collings Lakes; Williamstown; Buena; Buena Vista Twp.; Shamong and Medford.

Staff 

Gabriel Donio – Founder and publisher of The Hammonton Gazette. Donio is a graduate of Boston University, where he majored in English. After graduating from BU, he attended Georgetown University Graduate School. He is a 1991 graduate of Hammonton High School. Donio was named one of the "Top 40 Under 40" Best and Brightest Leaders in the region by Atlantic City Weekly in 2005.  He has been a member of the Atlantic County Cultural & Heritage Affairs Advisory Board since 2004.  He is the author of the book Images of America: Hammonton and is a member of the Historical Society of Hammonton. He served on the board of Southern Jersey Family Medical Centers. Donio is a past president of the Hammonton Lions Club and was awarded the St. Joseph High School Loyalty Award at the school's 2019 Red & White Celebration along with Gina Rullo. Donio is an Executive Producer of the weekly online shows "Gazette Sports Week" as well as the weekly "Gazette News Briefs," which he also hosts; and the monthly online show "Gazette In Fashion." He is a lifelong resident of Hammonton.
 
Gina Rullo – Editor-in-chief of The Hammonton Gazette. She is a graduate of Villanova University with a Bachelor of Science in finance. Originally from New York, Rullo now resides in Hammonton. She is a member of the Historical Society of Hammonton and the Woman's Civic Club and is a trustee for the Greater Hammonton Chamber of Commerce. Rullo was named one of the "Top 40 Under 40" Best and Brightest Leaders in the region by Atlantic City Weekly in 2006.  In 2010, Rullo was named to the Atlantic County Women's Hall of Fame. She was awarded the St. Joseph High School Loyalty Award at the school's 2019 Red & White Celebration along with Gabriel Donio. Rullo is the Executive Producer/Director of the weekly online show "Gazette Sports Week," the weekly "Gazette News Briefs" and the monthly online show "Gazette In Fashion." She has lived in Hammonton since 1998.

Dan Russoman – Sports editor of The Hammonton Gazette. Originally from Bloomfield, NJ, he is a graduate of Trenton State College (now The College of New Jersey). He has been The Gazette's Sports Editor since the paper began. He has also worked as a part-time reporter for the Daily Record (Parsippany, NJ) as well as internships at both the Times of Trenton and the Trentonian.  While at Trenton State, he earned two New Jersey Press Association Awards for Sportswriting (College Division). He currently resides in Vineland with his wife Laura and their three daughters.  Russoman is the author of Hometown Pride: The Tradition of Sports in Hammonton. Russoman can be seen weekly on "Gazette Sports Week" and "Gazette High School Football Report."
 
MarySusan Hoffman – Lead graphic designer of The Hammonton Gazette.  She is a 2006 graduate of Stockton University with a Bachelor of Arts Degree in Visual Communications / Graphic Design. She is a 2002 graduate of Hammonton High School. She, her husband Brian and their son are all lifelong residents of Hammonton.

Jaime Wuillermin — Wuillermin is the Copy Editor, Social Media Manager and Staff Writer of The Hammonton Gazette. Wuillermin is a resident of Hammonton.

Joseph F. Berenato – Staff writer and columnist of The Hammonton Gazette.  Berenato served as The Gazettes entertainment editor from 1997 to 2001 and is happy to be back. He is a published author and editor, specializing in pop culture exploration. He is a 2000 graduate of Rowan University with a BA in English, and a 2015 Rowan grad with an MA in writing. Except for a few years here and there, he is a lifelong Hammonton resident.

Fenway – The Gazettes mascot, a loveable golden doodle.

Contributors:
Dan Bachalis, columnist;
Donna Brown, columnist;
Cherie Calletta, columnist;
Rocco DeLaurentis, columnist;
Michael Donio, columnist;
Maria Drzaszcz, columnist;
Bob Garver, columnist;
Lorraine Griffiths, columnist;
Betsey Karl, photographer;
Kurt Loder, movie critic;
Jim Miller, columnist;
Dr. Ron Newman, columnist;
Jim Siwek, columnist

Sections 

News: The lead section of the Gazette includes articles and photography about municipal and school government, elections, crime, obituaries, features on local people, community events and major economic developments, especially revitalization efforts for the downtown area and the uptown section including the White Horse Pike (Route 30) and Route 206.

Opinion: Editorials, columnists, political cartoons, guest perspectives and letters to the editor are printed in this section.

Business & Finance: Columnists write on a variety of economic topics.  Features on real estate and local businesses alternate each week.

Our Town: Community-oriented articles appear in this section. Weekly features include Hammonton's History, Civic News and Faith Focus. Notable Locals, engagement announcements and wedding announcements are also printed in Our Town.

Education: Featuring the achievements of the students of the Hammonton and St. Joseph School Districts.

Noticias: News, events and sports from Hammonton in Spanish.

Neighbors: Coverage of towns that surround Hammonton, including Folsom, Waterford Twp. (Atco), Mullica Twp., Egg Harbor City, Winslow Twp., Collings Lakes, Vineland, Buena Vista Twp., Buena, Shamong and Medford.

Comics: Comic strips including “Animal Crackers,” “Broom-Hilda,” “Dick Tracy,” “Gasoline Alley” and “The Middletons.”

Arts & Entertainment: Entertainment venues and events from Atlantic City to Philadelphia to New York City and throughout southern New Jersey are included. Movie reviews, the What's Hot listing of events, the Mind Games page and horoscopes are published weekly. 

Health & Fitness: Local health experts write on a variety of health-related topics.

Cuisine: Columns, recipes and features on food and restaurants.

Home & Family: Columns and articles on family life, pet care, home decorating and parenting.

Antiques: Pictures and an article about local antiques.

Sports: Reporters cover every team from the Hammonton Blue Devils of Hammonton High School and the St. Joseph Wildcats of St. Joseph High School, every week of the school year.  Youth and recreation teams are also covered. The Hammonton Hot Shots of the Atlantic County Baseball League are featured during the summer. Fantasy sports and Philadelphia pro sports are also subjects of coverage.

Hammy Awards 

Since 1998, The Gazette has given out its signature and exclusive Hammy Awards in the first week of July in conjunction with the anniversary edition of the newspaper. Hammy Awards are given in the following categories: Restaurant, People, Miscellaneous, Food & Drinks, Only in Hammonton and Just Over the Border. Winners are printed in the anniversary edition in the first week of July.  Photos of winners with their Hammy Awards are pictured in a later edition of the newspaper.  Voting for Hammy Awards begins in June.

Website 

The Gazette's website (hammontongazette.com) has been online since 1998. A portion of the information from the print edition is available on the website. Articles can be easily shared via social media, email and text. Local updated weather, photo galleries and links to local websites are all available. The website also has the entire Hammonton Telephone Directory, completely searchable, as well as banner ads with links to more than 110 advertisers' websites or social media. In addition, the website serves as the main portal to The Gazette's Digital Edition, and YouTube shows "Gazette Sports Week," "Gazette News Briefs," "Gazette In Fashion" and "Gazette High School Football Report."

Twitter feeds 

The Gazette's Twitter feed @HammGazette was launched on October 1, 2014.  Readers can receive tweets and interact with The Gazette online.  Readers of The Gazette sports section and viewers of "Gazette Sports Week" and "Gazette High School Football Report" can read Sports Editor Dan Russoman's tweets at @danrussoman.

Gazette Sports Week 

"Gazette Sports Week" is a weekly online streaming video show that was launched on February 26, 2014. The show, hosted by Gazette Sports Editor Dan Russoman features local high school sports news and analysis of teams from Hammonton High School, St. Joseph Academy and the schools they compete against in all sports. Regional and national sports topics are also covered on the show. Each week a guest is interviewed. The show ends with the "Final Five" questions answered by Russoman."Gazette Sports Week" is recorded at the offices of The Gazette.

Gazette High School Football Report 

"Gazette High School Football Report" is a 12-week online streaming video show that was launched on September 10, 2014.  The show, hosted by Gazette Sports Editor Dan Russoman and Dave Birnbaum, focuses on the Hammonton High School Blue Devils and the St. Joseph Academy Wildcats, high school football teams based in Hammonton.  Recaps, news, analysis and predictions about high school football in the West Jersey Football League (WJFL), where the two teams play, are featured each week on the show. "Gazette High School Football Report" is recorded in the offices of The Gazette.

Gazette In Fashion 
"Gazette In Fashion" is a monthly show focused on fashion and beauty in the Hammonton Area hosted by The Gazette's Franki Rudnesky. The 30-minute show features the latest trends, how-tos, interviews and more. "Gazette In Fashion" is recorded in the offices of The Gazette and on location.

Gazette News Briefs
“Gazette News Briefs” is a weekly show featuring local news hosted by The Gazette’s Gabe Donio. The 3-minute show is new each Thursday. “Gazette News Briefs” is recorded in the offices of The Gazette.

The Hammontonian Magazine
The Hammontonian Magazine is a quarterly publication distributed within the print edition of The Gazette on newsstands and subscriptions in black and white. The online versions include the Digital Edition and a free edition at www.hammontongazette.com, both in color. The magazine debuted on January 19, 2022.
Sections in the first edition included: In Fashion, Something Blue, Automotive, Athletics, In the Kitchen, Sparkle, It’s A Hammonton Thing, Culture, Getaway, Garden, Back In The Day and The Final Word.

Gazette Print Shop
The Gazette’s print division can place imprints and logos on virtually any item. Visit hammontongazette.com or hammontonshops.com for details. From menus to shirts to banners and nearly any other printable item, Gazette Print Shop can help make your print dreams a reality.

External links 

Hammonton, New Jersey
Newspapers published in New Jersey
Weekly newspapers published in the United States
Newspapers established in 1997